Chiller (stylized as chiller) was an American cable and satellite television network that was owned by NBCUniversal Cable Entertainment Group subsidiary of NBCUniversal, all owned by Comcast. It later opened its own film production company as well.  Chiller specialized in horror, thriller and suspense programming, mainly films.

As of February 2015, 38,820,000 American households (33.4% of households with television) received Chiller, though this declined with later removals by several cable services as carriage agreements expired.

The channel ceased operations on December 31, 2017.

History
On January 12, 2007, NBCUniversal announced its intent to launch Chiller on March 1, dedicated to films and television shows related to the horror genre. The company also stated that, aside from their own content, Chiller would feature content from competing film studios, including Lionsgate, Sony, Warner Bros., and 20th Century Fox. In February 2007, The 101, channel 101 on DirecTV, aired a "preview" of Chiller, featuring the pilot episodes of Twin Peaks and American Gothic, as well as various horror movies and programs. Sleuth, NBC/Universal's mystery-themed network later known as Cloo, aired a fourteen-hour movie marathon entitled "Chiller On Sleuth" to promote the launch of Chiller. The channel officially launched at 6:00 am Eastern/5:00 am Central on March 1. After a brief introduction to the channel, Chiller aired its first program, Alfred Hitchcock Presents.

On July 30, 2014, its carriage was merged with that of its former competitor Fearnet, a network launched by Comcast in 2006 as a video on demand service 6 years before their purchase of NBCUniversal.

Carriage decline and end of operations
The termination of Cloo on February 1, 2017, along with Esquire Network on June 28, and Universal HD (another NBCUniversal network rebranding as the Olympic Channel) on July 14, as non-prime networks in NBCU's cable portfolio, portended Chiller's fate at the end of 2017.

On February 1, 2017 (the same day sister network Cloo ended all operations), Dish removed the channel from their lineup, with Charter Communications (Spectrum, Time Warner Cable and Bright House Networks subsidiaries) dropping it and Esquire Network on April 25. Five months later on October 2, 2017, it was discontinued by Verizon FiOS, while Mediacom quietly removed the channel from their lineup on October 23.

Cox effectively dropped the network on November 8, 2017, when it refused to continue their carriage of Chiller within their new carriage agreements with NBCUniversal Cable Entertainment Group, removing the network from several Cox regional outlets,

On November 16, 2017, NBC Universal Cable Networks confirmed that the channel would end all operations on December 31. Google Fiber stopped carrying Chiller on December 20, which left DirecTV and AT&T U-Verse as two of the last providers to carry Chiller until its demise. A year-end ratings recap showed Chiller as ranked 127 out of 136 networks, averaging 36,000 viewers a night.

The network officially left the air around 11:59 p.m. ET on December 31 after an airing of The Babadook with a simple message of "Thank you for watching Chiller. Good night!", after which the channel spaces created by Fearnet in 2006 and Chiller in 2007 both folded and ceased to exist. Its website was redirected to that of Syfy a few hours before.

Programming

Originals

On December 17, 2010, Chiller premiered Chiller 13: The Decade's Scariest Movie Moments. The countdown special featured a diverse group of pop culture mavens and horror movie experts looking back on the top 13 scary movie moments between 2000 and 2010. Show participants include renowned special makeup effects supervisor Greg Nicotero (The Walking Dead), comedians Dan Gurewitch & David Young (CollegeHumor), actress Betsy Russell (the Saw films), writer Steve Niles, Tony Todd and horror film director Lucky McKee among others. In October 2011, Chiller continued the franchise with Chiller 13: Horror's Creepiest Kids.

In December 2011, Chiller premiered its first original movie entitled Steve Niles' Remains, based on the IDW Publishing comic book by Steve Niles and Kieron Dwyer.

On March 4, 2016, Chiller premiered its first (and only) original television series entitled Slasher. Netflix acquired the licensing rights to the series after the first season.

Acquired programs
Chiller's acquired slate included genre films, international series (Afterlife, Apparitions), non-scripted programs (Fear Factor), and anthology shows (Masters of Horror).

For a period of a month in July 2015 the channel provided  selection of anime. The weekly block aired from midnight to 2:00am on Wednesdays, but was summarily cancelled due to poor ratings. Aside from the aforementioned Tokyo Majin, Devil May Cry: The Animted Series, Is This A Zombie?, and Black Blood Brothers also found their home on the block.

Dare 2 Direct Film Festivals
In October 2007, Chiller announced its "Dare 2 Direct Film Festival" which premiered on Halloween night. Viewers uploaded 300 short films and the winners aired on this original special.

Chiller renewed its Dare 2 Direct Film Festival in 2008, which aired on Halloween night. The channel premiered webisodes of an original film, "The Hills Are Alive" from Tim Burton protégé Caroline Thompson (co-screenwriter of Tim Burton's Corpse Bride and screenwriter of Edward Scissorhands) in July on chillertv.com, and aired the complete film as its first original film in October.

Chiller Films

Chiller Films was a film production company based in New York that specializes in indie horror and thriller films. It was launched in 2011 to give select Chiller movies limited theatrical runs and nationwide VOD distribution, using a simultaneous, or "day-and date" film release strategy. This means films are released in a limited number of small and multiplex theaters in large markets, along with release on video on demand through cable providers and online film retailers the same day. Most of the films are from independent filmmakers who then license their properties to Chiller Films. With the end of the channel it was connected to, the current status of Chiller Films is unknown.

References

External links
 

English-language television stations in the United States
NBCUniversal networks
Television channels and stations established in 2007
Television channels and stations disestablished in 2017
Companies based in New York City
Film distributors of the United States
Defunct television networks in the United States